The Upper Kintla Lake Patrol Cabin in Glacier National Park is a rustic backcountry log cabin. Built in 1931 to standard National Park Service plan G913, the cabin has a single room. The cabin was modeled after similar cabins used at Yellowstone National Park, which were in turn similar to those used by the U.S. Forest Service, which resembled trappers' cabins.

References

Ranger stations in Glacier National Park (U.S.)
Park buildings and structures on the National Register of Historic Places in Montana
Government buildings completed in 1931
Log cabins in the United States
Rustic architecture in Montana
National Register of Historic Places in Flathead County, Montana
Log buildings and structures on the National Register of Historic Places in Montana
1931 establishments in Montana
National Register of Historic Places in Glacier National Park